Leslie Smith (born September 16, 1958) is an American former alpine skier who competed in the 1976 Winter Olympics. A native of Rutland, Vermont, Smith skied collegiately for Middlebury College.

References

External links
 sports-reference.com

1958 births
Living people
American female alpine skiers
Olympic alpine skiers of the United States
Alpine skiers at the 1976 Winter Olympics
Sportspeople from Vermont
Middlebury College alumni
People from Rutland (city), Vermont
21st-century American women